Repetitive electrical impulse noise (REIN) is a term applied to some interference found on problematic DSL internet connections. The interference can be detected as electrical impulses on the physical telephone line on which the internet connection operates. REIN is particularly problematic as it can cause DSL modems to lose synchronisation and drop connection.

The noise causes interference which in turn causes a DSL modem to mount up CRC errors. This eventually causes DSL synchronisation to drop.

REIN is often caused by faulty electrical equipment which is in the proximity of the broadband telephone line. Usually the equipment is emitting a radio frequency, which causes electrical impulses along the telephone line.

The cause of the repetitive electrical impulse noise can be traced by using a directional radio frequency analyzer.

References 

Digital subscriber line